End organ damage usually refers to damage occurring in major organs fed by the circulatory system (heart, kidneys, brain, eyes) which can sustain damage due to uncontrolled hypertension, hypotension, or hypovolemia.

Evidence of hypertensive damage
In the context of hypertension, features include:
 Heart - evidence on electrocardiogram screening of the heart muscle thickening (but may also be seen on chest X-ray) suggesting left ventricular hypertrophy) or by echocardiography of less efficient function (left ventricular failure). 
 Brain- hypertensive encephalopathy, hemorrhagic stroke, subarachnoid hemorrhage, confusion, loss of consciousness, eclampsia, seizures, or transient ischemic attack.
 Kidney - leakage of protein into the urine (albuminuria or proteinuria), or reduced renal function, hypertensive nephropathy, acute renal failure, or glomerulonephritis.
 Eye - evidence upon fundoscopic examination of hypertensive retinopathy, retinal hemorrhage, papilledema and blindness.
 Peripheral arteries - peripheral vascular disease and chronic lower limb ischemia.

Evidence of shock
In the context of poor end organ perfusion, features include:
 Kidney - poor urine output (less than 0.5 mL/kg), low glomerular filtration rate.
 Skin - pallor or mottled appearance, capillary refill > 2 secs, cool limbs.
 Brain - obtundation or disorientation to time, person, and place. The Glasgow Coma Scale may be used to quantify altered consciousness.
 Gut - absent bowel sounds, ileus

References

Medical terminology